Dmitri Vladimirovich Ignatenko (born 27 January 1969) is a former Russian football player.

References

1969 births
Footballers from Saint Petersburg
Living people
Soviet footballers
FC Zenit Saint Petersburg players
FC Mordovia Saransk players
FC Shakhter Karagandy players
Russian footballers
FC Luch Vladivostok players
Russian Premier League players
Association football defenders
FC Izhevsk players
FC Lokomotiv Saint Petersburg players